David William Stegman (born January 30, 1954) is a former Major League Baseball outfielder. He played all or part of six seasons in the majors for the Detroit Tigers (1978–1980), New York Yankees (1982) and Chicago White Sox (1983–1984). During his 6 seasons he played in 172 games and had 320 at bats, 39 runs scored, 66 hits, 10 doubles, 2 triples, 8 home runs, 32 RBI, 5 stolen bases, 31 walks, a .206 batting average, a .277 on-base percentage, a .325 slugging percentage, 104 total bases, 4 sacrifice hits and 4 sacrifice flies.

Amateur career
However, he opted not to sign and instead went to play college baseball at the University of Arizona. After his junior year, he was drafted twice more, once by the Boston Red Sox in June 1975 and then again by the Atlanta Braves in January 1976, but he returned for his senior season. Then, in June 1976, he was picked with the second pick of the secondary phase by the Tigers.

Professional career

Detroit Tigers 
Stegman was immediately assigned to the Double-A Montgomery Rebels, just two steps below the major leagues. He played 61 games for Montgomery, batting .266 with a .379 on-base percentage, but he failed to hit a home run.

The following season, Stegman again started at Montgomery, posting much better numbers. In 67 games, he hit an impressive .345, with 11 home runs and 59 RBI. His OBP also rose over 100 points, to an excellent .488. This earned him a promotion to the Triple-A Evansville Triplets. His numbers there took a nosedive, batting just .222 in 50 games, although his power numbers were still decent, with 6 home runs.

This earned him a promotion when rosters expanded in September. In his MLB debut, Stegman appeared in 8 games, batting 14 times with 4 hits. In the next-to-last game of the season, Stegman hit his first major league home run on September 30 against the Baltimore Orioles.

The  season looked a lot like 1978 for Stegman, as he spent the entire season with the Triplets, getting called up in September. This time, Stegman got more of a chance, appearing in 12 games with 33 at bats. Although he hit just .194, he did hit three home runs among his six hits.

In , Stegman made the Tigers out of spring training. Serving as a reserve outfielder, he batted just .181 through August 6 before being set back to Evansville. He returned in September, but went just 2-for-14 down the stretch. After the season, he was traded to the San Diego Padres for relief pitcher Dennis Kinney.

Padres and Yankees 
Stegman began the  season in the minors once more, this time with the Hawaii Islanders. However, just 14 games into the season, he was traded a second time, this time to the New York Yankees. He spent the rest of the year with the Columbus Clippers, batting .291 in 90 games. In , Stegman spent nearly the entire season with Columbus, batting .272. He returned to the majors in June, but made just two appearances—both as a pinch runner, before returning to Columbus. He became a free agent after the season.

White Sox 
The Chicago White Sox signed Stegman as a minor league free agent the following January. Once more, he began the season in the minor leagues with the Denver Bears.  There, he had his best season statistically at the Triple-A level, batting .334 in 111 games and earning a callup in August. He appeared in 30 games over the remainder of the season, batting just .170 in 53 at bats.

He batted .261 in 55 games before finishing the season back in Denver.

External links

1954 births
Arizona Wildcats baseball players
Living people
Chicago White Sox players
Detroit Tigers players
New York Yankees players
Baseball players from Inglewood, California
Major League Baseball outfielders
Pan American Games medalists in baseball
Pan American Games silver medalists for the United States
All-American college baseball players
Baseball players at the 1975 Pan American Games
Medalists at the 1975 Pan American Games
Columbus Clippers players
Denver Bears players
Denver Zephyrs players
Evansville Triplets players
Hawaii Islanders players
Montgomery Rebels players
Syracuse Chiefs players